Hercules is a city in western Contra Costa County, California. As of 2010, its population was 24,060, according to the United States Census Bureau. The site of Hercules was first developed in 1881 as a manufacturing facility of the California Powder Works for the production of its patented dynamite formulation, Hercules powder. In 1882, the Hercules Powder Company was incorporated and assumed responsibility for the Hercules site. It was one of several explosive manufacturers that were active along the Pinole shoreline in the late 19th to the mid-20th century. The small company town that grew up near the facility subsequently became known as "Hercules", and was incorporated at the end of 1900. Starting in the 1970s, Hercules was heavily redeveloped as suburban bedroom community that lies along the I-80 corridor in Western Contra Costa County. It has a very ethnically diverse population.

History

Prehistory through the 20th century
Contra Costa County’s first inhabitants arrived in the area six to ten thousand years ago, including the Bay Miwok people and the Huichin Ohlone People; however there were no known significant settlements in the Hercules area.

The land that would become Hercules was part of a tract of land known as “Pinole y Canada del Hambre” which was granted in 1823 to Ygnacio Martinez (for whom the city of Martinez, California was named) for his service as the commandant of the Presidio of San Francisco. This grant was reconfirmed in 1842 as Rancho El Pinole. In 1848, this area became part of the United States with the rest of California. Contra Costa County was created in 1850 as one of California's original 27 counties. The Central Pacific Railroad (later part of Southern Pacific) ran the first rail lines across Hercules’ waterfront in late 1878, as the main route for the Transcontinental Railroad was realigned via train ferry through the purpose-built town of Port Costa then to Richmond and Berkeley to connect at the Oakland Pier. The Atchison, Topeka and Santa Fe Railroad came through the area around 1899.

The city's history was primarily shaped by the Hercules Powder Company, named after its main product “Hercules powder”, a specially patented (1874) formulation of dynamite, in turn named after the Roman hero. It began as the California Powder Works with locations in Golden Gate Park and Santa Cruz, California, but the expansion of San Francisco forced the company to find a more remote location for the dangerous process of manufacturing explosives. Hercules's isolated location at the time, plus its proximity to rail and water transportation along San Pablo Bay, made it an ideal choice. In 1879, the company, backed by DuPont and the Laflin & Rand Powder Company created the Hercules Powder Company which purchased land for a new plant that opened in 1881. On December 15, 1900, town management incorporated the City of Hercules as it felt that the County Board of Supervisors had become less supportive of the plant. A post office was established in 1914. On USGS maps the place designation Herpoco (for Hercules Powder Company) along the original Atchison, Topeka and Santa Fe Railway right-of-way (now BNSF), still remains.

Explosives manufacturing was indeed a hazardous industry in that era: in the first 38 years of operations in Hercules, 59 lives would be lost including 24 in a large explosion in February 1908. Later, further deadly explosions would plague the plant in 1944, 1948 and 1953. The Sherman Antitrust Act would force Dupont to spin the Hercules Powder Company off as an independent company in 1912.

The explosives manufactured at Hercules played a significant and decisive role in the United States Army's efforts to contain the fires started by the 1906 San Francisco earthquake, as recounted by General Funston.

Between the 1890s and 1970s, Hercules was a company town of several hundred people. 36 buildings from this era still exist and were nominated to the National Register of Historic Places in 1980. Per this application, “Hercules was the area’s most desirable community to live in” with well-kept homes, a (male only) clubhouse, lighted tennis courts, and hospital. However, all residents were company employees. Although Chinese workers were a large component of the company workforce before the 1910s, they were excluded from residency in the town beyond dormitories provided for them.

By 1917, the Hercules plant had become the largest producer of TNT in the country. During both World Wars Hercules Powder Company, along with Giant Powder Works in neighboring Pinole, supplied the U.S. Navy with explosives through the Port Chicago Magazine (location of the infamous Port Chicago disaster in 1944) which became the now closed Concord Naval Weapons Station. By the 1940s, Hercules organized its own law enforcement department and longtime Hercules Powder Company employee William Darke was named sheriff, becoming its first officer.

After World War II the company began to diversify its production line and build an anhydrous ammonia plant, a base for fertilizer. Explosive manufacturing was discontinued in Hercules in 1964 (neighboring Giant Powder stopped its operations in 1960). In 1974, the cessation of explosives production allowed hundreds of acres of protective “buffer” land (separated by large stands of eucalyptus trees, many of which still stand) to be reused for other purposes. Starting in 1974, real estate development companies began to develop the land and Hercules began to transform into the bedroom community it is known as today. Eventually, the ammonia plant began to be outcompeted by foreign manufacturers, and this combined with labor issues, resulted in its permanent closure in 1976. Although Hercules Powder Company is now gone one legacy remains: a study has been made of upper layer soil contamination from prior emissions of the California Powder Works operations.

In 1966 the Pacific Refinery company started operation on the shores of Hercules and served as large employer until its closure in 1995. Its demise marked the end of 114 years of heavy industry in Hercules. The land the refinery was located on was redeveloped as the Victoria by the Bay subdivision in early 2000s. Biorad, a Fortune 500 biotech company established its headquarters in Hercules in the 1980s and continues to be the town's largest employer.

Starting in the 1970s Hercules created and has continuously updated its master plan to further its development. During the 1970s, Hercules was one of the first cities in the United States to develop a comprehensive Noise Element of the General Plan. This work included the production of noise contour maps for all major highways and arterial roads, as well as a citywide noise mitigation plan. Heavy development as a suburb continued through the 1980s through the present day.

The town's population grew rapidly in the last decades of the 20th century. Per United States Census Bureau data, what was sleepy town of 252 in 1970 grew nearly 24-fold into a town of 5,963 by 1980 which tripled again into a town of 16,829 by 1990. By 2000, the town began to level out to its current population of approximately 25,000.

Recent history and development

In 2000, the City of Hercules chartered an urban-design-based land use planning effort. This plan attempted to balance the preservation of the city's undeveloped land against continued suburban sprawl and to redevelop the city's formerly industrial waterfront. The resulting plan directs that Hercules be turned into a transit-oriented, pedestrian-friendly, mixed-use town. Several new developments were started in that era based on the plan, including the Central Waterfront around the historic core of Hercules and Victoria by the Bay. However the development of Hercules has not been without is challenges.

In a national story in 2006, Hercules strongly opposed Walmart's attempt to build a new supercenter store on 17-acre (69,000 m2) property overlooking San Pablo Bay as many residents deemed it incompatible with the waterfront redevelopment project, and it was unneeded due to the close proximity of two other Walmarts in Richmond and Vallejo. On May 23, 2006, the Hercules city council voted unanimously to use its power of eminent domain to prevent Wal-Mart from building the supercenter. In 2009, the city purchased the land back from Walmart.

In 2012, a state audit found that the City of Hercules had spent nearly $50 million on “questionable transactions” primarily centered on the city's redevelopment projects (the investigation focused on city manager Nelson Oliva who steered millions of city funds to himself and to a firm run by his relatives). Combined with the Great recession, this nearly bankrupted the city in the late 2000s. Later, new developments came in the market and the city repaired its financial condition.

Geography

Location and surroundings

Hercules is on the southeastern shores of San Pablo Bay, roughly 4 miles southwest of the Carquinez Bridge. By road, Hercules is roughly 12 miles north of Berkeley, California, 18 miles north of Oakland and 22 miles northeast of San Francisco. The shoreline at this location runs northeast to southwest. Refugio Creek runs through the middle of Hercules in a northwest direction and empties at the shoreline.

The town is bisected by Interstate 80 which runs parallel and roughly one mile inland from the coast. I-80 is the main highway between San Francisco and Sacramento and intersects California State Route 4 in the city limits. Major arterial roads include San Pablo Road which lies to the north of I-80 (this road is also Historic US 40, which was the predecessor to I-80) and Refugio Valley Road which runs in a northwest–southeast direction along Refugio Creek.

Cityscape

The city has a suburban character dominated by mostly two story detached and attached homes and one story commercial buildings divided into various subdivisions along well landscaped roads. Hercules’ commercial centers (which are mainly neighborhood shopping centers) lie in center of the city close to the convergence of the roads named above. The portion inland of Highway 80, which extends 4 miles inland mainly gently rolling hills along Refugio Valley Road, is primarily suburbs built between the 1970s and 1980s. It includes neighborhoods known to the locals as “the Birds”, “the Trees and Flowers”, “the Gemstones”, “the Astronauts”, and “the Islands”, per the street naming conventions of each subdivision. The portion near the shoreline, somewhat flatter but still rolling terrain, was developed starting in the 1980s and has some of the town's newer developments including the Waterfront centered around the historic old town, Olympian Hills (which uses Greek mythical figures for its street naming convention), Hercules by the Bay, Village Park and Victoria by the Bay/New Pacific.

Climate
Hercules has a mild Mediterranean climate (Köppen climate classification Csb or "Warm-summer Mediterranean"), consistent with much of the northern San Francisco Bay Area. As Hercules is more inland, it is generally warmer than communities closer to the Golden Gate. Average rainfall is 23.35” concentrated from November to March. The average July high is 71 degrees and the average January low is 43 degrees.

Parks and recreation
Hercules has over 98 acres of parkland in six parks created as part of its master planning effort, the most central being Refugio Valley Park, and has over 950 additional acres of open space.  Hercules is also close to several regional nature preserves including Point Pinole Regional Shoreline, Crockett Hills Regional Park, Carquinez Strait, Wildcat Canyon and Sobrante Ridge Botanic Regional Preserve. Franklin Canyon Golf Course is an 18-hole golf course at the east side of the city. The San Francisco Bay Trail runs right along Hercules' waterfront. The urban centers of Oakland and San Francisco are 18 and 22 miles away respectively. Wine Country (Napa and Sonoma) is roughly a half hour drive to the north.

Demographics

Race and ethnicity
Hercules has a diverse population. Per 2015 Census data, the town's population is  45.5% Asian, 22% White, 18.9% Black, and 14.6% Hispanic. 32.0% of the population is foreign born.

Household income, education and occupations

Per 2014 US Census data, the median household income in the city was $101,018, and the median income for a family was $113,658, which would put much of Hercules’ population in the upper middle class or “mass affluent” categories. Males had a median income of $66,348 and females had a median income of $59,517.  The per capita income for the city was $37,247. About 4.0% of families and 5.1% of the population were below the poverty line, including 5.2% of persons under age 18 and 3.2% of those 65 or over. Per the same dataset, 42.7% of Hercules residents were college educated. 46.0% of residents were employed in management, business and arts occupations, 27.2% in sales and office occupations, and 14.3% in service occupations.

2010 US Census data
The 2010 United States Census reported that Hercules had a population of 24,060. The racial makeup of Hercules was 5,302 (22.0%) White, 4,547 (18.9%) African American, 102 (0.4%) Native American, 10,956 (45.5%) Asian, 101 (0.4%) Pacific Islander, 1,564 (6.5%) from other races, and 1,488 (6.2%) from two or more races. Hispanic or Latino of any race were 3,508 persons (14.6%).

The Census reported that 24,005 people (99.8% of the population) lived in households, 17 (0.1%) lived in non-institutionalized group quarters, and 38 (0.2%) were institutionalized.

There were 8,115 households, out of which 3,175 (39.1%) had children under the age of 18 living in them, 4,675 (57.6%) were opposite-sex married couples living together, 1,250 (15.4%) had a female householder with no husband present, 371 (4.6%) had a male householder with no wife present. There were 344 (4.2%) unmarried opposite-sex partnerships, and 66 (0.8%) same-sex married couples or partnerships. 1,482 households (18.3%) were made up of individuals, and 449 (5.5%) had someone living alone who was 65 years of age or older. The average household size was 2.96. There were 6,296 families (77.6% of all households); the average family size was 3.38.

The population was spread out, with 5,481 people (22.8%) under the age of 18, 2,064 people (8.6%) aged 18 to 24, 6,512 people (27.1%) aged 25 to 44, 7,473 people (31.1%) aged 45 to 64, and 2,530 people (10.5%) who were 65 years of age or older. The median age was 39.0 years. For every 100 females, there were 90.1 males. For every 100 females age 18 and over, there were 86.0 males.

The homeowner vacancy rate was 2.3%; the rental vacancy rate was 6.2%. 19,067 people (79.2% of the population) lived in owner-occupied housing units and 4,938 people (20.5%) lived in rental housing units.

2000 US Census data
As of the census of 2000, there were 19,488 people, 6,423 households, and 4,997 families residing in the city. The racial makeup of the city was 27.98% White, 18.78% African American, 0.25% Native American, 42.73% Asian, 0.46% Pacific Islander, 4.47% from other races, and 5.33% from two or more races. 10.81% of the population were Hispanic or Latino of any race.

There were 6,423 households, out of which 41.7% had children under the age of 18 living with them, 60.8% were married couples living together, 13.2% had a female householder with no husband present, and 22.2% were non-families. 17.8% of all households were made up of individuals, and 3.7% had someone living alone who was 65 years of age or older. The average household size was 3.03 and the average family size was 3.46.

In the city, the population was spread out, with 26.6% under the age of 18, 8.5% from 18 to 24, 30.2% from 25 to 44, 27.3% from 45 to 64, and 7.4% who were 65 years of age or older. The median age was 37 years. For every 100 females, there were 90.3 males. For every 100 females age 18 and over, there were 86.2 males.

According to a 2007 estimate, the median income for a household in the city was $88,966, and the median income for a family was $93,294. Males had a median income of $50,672 versus $40,433 for females. The per capita income for the city was $27,699. About 1.9% of families and 3.2% of the population were below the poverty line, including 3.5% of those under age 18 and 5.4% of those age 65 or over.

Economy

Overview
Hercules is primarily a suburban community, but is the headquarters of Bio-Rad, a Fortune 500 biotech company which as of 2017 had 7,800 employees worldwide and $2.1 billion in revenue. The company is located in the North Shore Business park which includes over 1.1 million square feet of industrial and R&D space. The community has an additional 210,000sf of retail and office space in three neighborhood shopping centers.

Top employers
According to the city's 2020 Comprehensive Annual Financial Report, the top 10 employers in the city are:

Government

Form
Hercules has a council-manager form of government where five elected city council members appoint a city manager who runs the City administration. In the early years of Hercules, the council members were nearly always officers of the Hercules Powder Company. The five council seats are at large and served in four-year staggered terms. Elections are held the first Tuesday after the first Monday in November, which generally coincides with state and federal election days. In December, after any election the council selects from its own a Mayor and Vice Mayor which serve one-year terms. The City Council also appoint the city attorney, planning commissioners, community and library associations and others.

Crime
Hercules has a generally low crime rate. Based on 2014 FBI Data, Hercules had 1.12 violent crimes per 1,000 and 13.27 property crimes per thousand, lower than national and state averages. Between 2000 and 2010, the city had only five murders. Another source, using the same data, classified Hercules as the 35th safest city in California in 2016, and 60th in 2017.

Politics
In 2017, Hercules had 14,293 registered voters with 8,406 (58.8%) registered as Democrats, 1,743 (12.2%) registered as Republicans, and 3,703 (25.9%) decline to state voters.

Education

Public schools 
Hercules is served by two school districts: the West Contra Costa Unified School District and the John Swett Unified School District. The JSUSD serves the Foxboro area (east of Interstate 80 and north of State Route 4) and the WCCUSD serves the rest of the city.
 Hercules Middle/High School serves as the main middle and high school in the city.
 Hanna Ranch Elementary serves the Trees and Mandalay area.
 Ohlone Elementary serves the Birds, Gems and the Hercules Avenue area.
 Lupine Elementary serves the Trees and Flowers area.

Public libraries
The  Contra Costa County Library System operates the Hercules Public Library.

Infrastructure

Transportation
Hercules is at the intersection of I-80 and State Route 4. I-80 is an interstate that is the principal route between San Francisco and Sacramento. Highway 4 lead to I -680 which provide access to Concord, California, Walnut Creek, California and the Tri-Valley Area. Per 2015 Census Data, 90% of Hercules’ workforce commutes via automobile to work, the average commute time is 39 minutes.

Public transportation is available through the WestCat bus system. The operator provides local and school buses throughout Hercules and to the neighboring cities of Rodeo, Pinole, and Richmond among other areas. WestCat also offers express buses to the county seat at Martinez, the El Cerrito del Norte BART station and the San Francisco Transbay Terminal. Its major hub is Hercules Transit Center. This had been the proposed location of a future Bay Area Rapid Transit station in BART's 20-year plan, but Hercules Mayor John Delgado and city council declined BART's request to fund a study, precluding the possibility of a BART stop.

The closest international airports are Oakland International (29 miles) and San Francisco International Airport (35 miles). The closest general aviation facilities are Buchanan Field in Concord and Napa County Airport in Napa.

The Southern Pacific and the Burlington Northern railroads (formerly the Atchison, Topeka and the Santa Fe Railway) have rail lines that pass through Hercules; however with the demise of industry Hercules no longer has a direct rail connection. However, a new Hercules station is planned that will provide a stop along the Capitol Corridor line with a target completion date of 2018. An environmental study is underway for San Francisco Bay Ferry Service to provide service from the same station to San Francisco, which would take 42 minutes.

Sister city
Hercules's sister city is Tsushima, Aichi Prefecture Japan.

Notable people
Willie McGee, former outfielder for the St. Louis Cardinals and the San Francisco Giants
Claudell Washington, former outfielder for the MLB. Lived in Hercules during his year with the New York Mets and his first year with the Atlanta Braves.

References

Sources

External links
 

 - government, business, library, recreation and more
City-Data.com - comprehensive statistical data and more about Hercules

 
Cities in Contra Costa County, California
Company towns in California
San Pablo Bay
Incorporated cities and towns in California
Populated places established in 1881
1881 establishments in California
Cities in the San Francisco Bay Area
Populated coastal places in California
Hercules Inc.